The 1909 Northwestern Purple team represented Northwestern University during the 1909 college football season. In their first and only year under head coach Bill Horr, the Purple compiled a 1–3–1 record (1–3 against Western Conference opponents) and finished in sixth place in the Western Conference.

Schedule

References

Northwestern
Northwestern Wildcats football seasons
Northwestern Purple football